Paul Henry Francis Leatherdale (born 1958) is a male British former sports shooter.

Sports shooting career
Leatherdale competed in the 1988 Summer Olympics.

He represented England and won a gold medal in the 10 metres air pistol pairs with Ian Reid and a silver medal in the 50 metres free pistol pairs with Richard Wang, at the 1986 Commonwealth Games in Edinburgh, Scotland. Four years later he represented England in the 10 metres air pistol and 50 metres free pistol events, at the 1990 Commonwealth Games in Auckland, New Zealand. A third appearance and third medal arrived at the 1994 Commonwealth Games when he competed in the 50 metres free pistol events and won the pairs with Mick Gault.

References

1958 births
Living people
British male sport shooters
Olympic shooters of Great Britain
Shooters at the 1988 Summer Olympics
Shooters at the 1986 Commonwealth Games
Shooters at the 1990 Commonwealth Games
Shooters at the 1994 Commonwealth Games
Commonwealth Games medallists in shooting
Commonwealth Games gold medallists for England
Commonwealth Games silver medallists for England
Commonwealth Games bronze medallists for England
20th-century British people
Medallists at the 1986 Commonwealth Games
Medallists at the 1994 Commonwealth Games